Jupiter and Callisto is a 1744 oil-on-canvas painting by François Boucher, now in the Pushkin Museum in Moscow. It shows Jupiter disguised as Diana to seduce Callisto.

Mythological theme
Jupiter, who is in love with Callisto, takes on the appearance of Diana to seduce her. The painting depicts the flirtation between Jupiter, under the disguise of the goddess of the hunt, and her favorite nymph.

Bibliography
Russia & Europe in the Nineteenth Century, Edward Strachan, Roy Bolton, Sphinx Fine Art, 2008 (page 86)

1744 paintings
Mythological paintings by François Boucher
Paintings in the collection of the Pushkin Museum
Paintings of Jupiter (mythology)